Eusebio Fernández Ardavín (1898–1965) was a Spanish screenwriter and film director. He was the brother of the playwright Luis Fernández Ardavín. His nephew César Fernández Ardavín who also became a film director, began his career working for Eusebio.

Selected filmography
 The Girl from Bejar (1926)
 Broken Lives (1933)
 The Moorish Queen (1937)
 The Queen's Flower Girl (1940)
 The Strange Marchioness (1940)
 The Wheel of Life (1942)
 El abanderado (1943)
 Lady in Ermine (1947)
 Neutrality (1949)
 Vertigo (1951)
 The Beauty of Cadiz (1953)

References

Bibliography 
 Bentley, Bernard. A Companion to Spanish Cinema. Boydell & Brewer 2008.

External links 
 

1898 births
1965 deaths
Spanish film directors
Spanish male screenwriters
People from Madrid
20th-century Spanish screenwriters
20th-century Spanish male writers